Torix may refer to:

 TorIX, or the Toronto Stock Exchange.
 Torix, a genus of freshwater leech.

